Brazeau is an unincorporated community in southeastern Perry County, Missouri, United States.

Etymology
The community is named after the nearby Brazeau Creek, which in turn was named for Joseph Brazeau (also spelled Obrazo), a merchant from St. Louis, Missouri, in 1791–1799, or by a member of his family.

History

Some of the earliest Americans to put down roots in Perry County were English and Scots-Irish Presbyterian settlers from Rowan, Iredell, Cabarrus, and Mecklenburg counties in North Carolina who settled Brazeau in 1817. There, they opened land in the Brazeau Creek drainage basin. In 1804, Brazeau was estimated to have had 88 inhabitants. The Evangelical Presbyterian Church of Brazeau was established on September 2, 1819, and a log church was erected. After a fire destroyed the log church in 1832, a new frame church was built in 1833 to replace the lost structure. A brick church, which is still in use, was built in 1854. An academy was established in the same year until public schools became prevalent in the 1880s. The people of Brazeau are said to have helped the Saxon-Lutheran immigrants from Germany during their first hard winter of 1839, saving them from possible starvation.

The Brazeau Post Office operated from 1879 until its closing in 2011. The small town once boasted a general store, a bank, and a John Deere dealership. Today, the small town is home to Hemmann Winery, established in 2003, which occupies the former general store.

Geography

Notable people
 Edward Robb (1857–1934), a U.S. Representative who was born in Brazeau and attended Brazeau Academy

Gallery

References

 

Unincorporated communities in Perry County, Missouri
Unincorporated communities in Missouri
1817 establishments in Missouri Territory